is a Japanese former professional baseball infielder.  He played for the Nippon-Ham Fighters in the Pacific League from 1994 to 1998.

References

Living people
1972 births
People from Nerima
Japanese baseball players
Nippon Professional Baseball infielders
Nippon Ham Fighters players